Monty Python and the Holy Grail Collectible Card Game is an out-of-print collectible card game (CCG) by Kenzer & Company based on the Monty Python and the Holy Grail movie. Brian Jelke was the designer. It was first released in June 1996 and noted as one of the more popular CCGs at that time due to being based on a movie franchise. The original set had 314 cards plus 3 promo cards. An expansion called Taunt You a Second Time was released in August 2000 and contained 158 cards. In 2006, the game was considered a "dead" CCG but with a niche following due to the "hilarious" gameplay in which the rules directed the player to speak in authentic movie accents and similar actions.

The game is set during the time of King Henry VIII. Each player starts the game by facing off, shaking hands, exchanging pleasantries, and commencing the card game. Each player builds a game state representing their own England out of 12 cards face down from his own deck. Each player supplies two cards to build Avalon which resides in between each player's England, and it represents the goal of the game. A player's knights and pages then carry coconuts through the locales of England and doing battle with other knights and pages along the way. Once at Avalon, they may search for the Holy Grail.

References

Further reading

Collectible card games
Card games introduced in 1996